Reel to Real may refer to:

 Reel to Real (Canadian TV series), on Rogers TV
 Reel to Real (album), by Love, 1974
 Reel to Real (EP), by Swervedriver, 1991
 Reel 2 Real, an American music duo

See also 
 Real to Reel (disambiguation)
 Reel to reel (disambiguation)